The 1977 World Military Championship was a football tournament which took place in Damascus, capital of Syria.

Qualification

Qualification stage

Group 1

  qualified for the final tournament

Group 2

  qualified for the final tournament

Group 3

  qualified for the final tournament

Group 4

  qualified for the final tournament

Group 5

  qualified for the final tournament

Group 6

  qualified for the final tournament

Group 7

  qualified for the final tournament

Qualified teams

 - qualified as host

Final tournament

Group stage

Group A

Group B

Knockout stage

7th-place match

5th-place match

3rd-place match

Final

Champion

External links
1977 World Men's Military Cup - rsssf.com

1977
1977 World Military Championship
1977
1977 in Syrian sport
Events in Damascus